Hooker Creek is a stream in the U.S. state of California

Hooker Creek also may refer to.

An earlier name for Lajamanu, Northern Territory, a  community in Australia
Hooker Creek Airport, an airport in Australia

See also
Hooker (disambiguation) 
Hooker River